Anasyntormon is a genus of flies in the family Dolichopodidae. It was originally placed in Rhaphiinae near Syntormon. It was moved to Dolichopodinae by Hans Ulrich (1980), who found it to be congeneric or closely related to Hercostomus.

The genus was originally created by Octave Parent in 1932; however, as he did not designate a type species for it, the name was unavailable until 1975, when C. E. Dyte designated A. secundus as the type species.

Species 
 Anasyntormon exceptus (Becker, 1922)
 Anasyntormon secundus Parent, 1932

References 

Dolichopodidae genera
Dolichopodinae